The Ardengost Formation is a geologic formation in France. It preserves fossils dating back to the Carboniferous period.

See also

 List of fossiliferous stratigraphic units in France

References
 

Carboniferous System of Europe
Carboniferous France
Carboniferous southern paleotropical deposits